Novyye Tukmakly (Yañı Tuqmaqlı) is a rural locality (a selo) in Starotukmaklinsky Selsoviet, Kushnarenkovsky District, Bashkortostan, Russia. The population was 197 as of 2010. There are 10 streets.

Geography 
Novyye Tukmakly is located 13 km southwest of Kushnarenkovo (the district's administrative centre) by road. Akhta is the nearest rural locality.

References 

Rural localities in Kushnarenkovsky District